Platycerus marginalis is a species of stag beetle, from the Lucinidae family and Lucaninae subfamily. It was discovered by Thomas Casey, Jr. in 1897.

Geographical distribution 
It can be found in North America.

References 

Beetles of North America
Beetles described in 1897
Lucanidae
Taxa named by Thomas Lincoln Casey Jr.